Le Cordon Bleu College of Culinary Arts in Chicago (formerly known as The Cooking and Hospitality Institute of Chicago) was founded in 1983, and closed in September 2017. The school was accredited by the Higher Learning Commission and was located in Chicago, Illinois. The school offered an Associate of Occupational Studies degree and Certificate Program in Le Cordon Bleu Culinary Arts and an Associate of Occupational Studies degree in Le Cordon Bleu Pâtisserie and Baking.

History 
Le Cordon Bleu College of Culinary Arts in Chicago (formerly known as The Cooking and Hospitality Institute of Chicago) was founded in May 1983. The school was designed to prepare students for careers in the culinary arts. Linda Calafiore, a successful cook, established the school using traditional European teaching methods.  Since its opening, the school has had thousands of graduates, many of whom went on to work in restaurants around the nation.

The school expanded in 1989 and received degree-granting authorization in 1991. Le Cordon Bleu College of Culinary Arts in Chicago was acquired on February 1, 2000, by the Career Education Corporation. In June 2000, the school became affiliated with Le Cordon Bleu. The Higher Learning Commission accredited the school in 2003.

The campus was again expanded in 2004. Due to demand for the Le Cordon Bleu Program, additional kitchen space was required. Five new industry-current kitchens were built, along with two classrooms and a modern computer lounge.

Closure

In December 2016, Career Education Corporation announced that it would no longer be enrolling students for its Le Cordon Bleu program on campuses across the United States. They closed the program entirely by September 2017. Todd Nelson, CEO of Career Education, cited federal regulations limiting loans for students at and continuing pressures on predatory practices by for-profit institutions as reasons for the closures.

Resources

External links
 Le Cordon Bleu College of Culinary Arts in Chicago

Cooking schools in the United States
Universities and colleges in Chicago
Former for-profit universities and colleges in the United States
Educational institutions established in 1983
1983 establishments in Illinois
Career Education Corporation
Educational institutions disestablished in 2017
2017 disestablishments in Illinois
Defunct private universities and colleges in Illinois